Fear Itself is the debut studio album from American hip hop artist Casual, released February 1, 1994 on Jive Records.

The album peaked at number 108 on the Billboard 200 chart.

Reception
Chris Witt of AllMusic commended Casual for his lyrical abilities, noting how the MC "produces an unending and seemingly unstoppable flow of boasts and taunts," and also remarking that "the simplicity of his message belies the complexity of his vicious wordplay." Cbeo H. Coker of Vibe said, "Casual's braggadocious, rip-roaring flow is fortified by upright bass lines, serpentine jazz/funk horns, and thunderous drum kicks."

In 2008, it was listed by Vibe as one of the 24 Lost Rap Classics.

Track listing

Chart history

Album

Singles

Personnel
Information taken from AllMusic.
engineering – Matt Kelley
mastering – Tom Coyne
mixing – Casual, Chris Trevett
photography – Michael Lucero
production – Casual, Del tha Funkee Homosapien, Domino, Jay Biz
scratching – Touré
vocals – A+, Del tha Funkee Homosapien, Extra Prolific, Pep Love, Phesto, Souls of Mischief, Tajai

References

External links
 

1994 debut albums
Casual (rapper) albums
Jive Records albums